Oswaldo Taurisano (28 May 1936 – 23 July 2012) is a Brazilian footballer. He played in seven matches for the Brazil national football team in 1963. He was also part of Brazil's squad for the 1963 South American Championship.

References

External links
 

1936 births
2012 deaths
Brazilian footballers
Brazil international footballers
Association football forwards
Sportspeople from Campinas
Esporte Clube São Bento players
Guarani FC players
CR Flamengo footballers
Clube Atlético Bragantino players